South Carolina Highway 27 (SC 27) is a  primary state highway in the U.S. state of South Carolina. It serves to connect the town of Ridgeville with nearby highways.

Route description
SC 27 is a two-lane rural highway that connect the town of Ridgeville south to the unincorporated community of Givhans to its south and highways U.S. Route 78 (US 78), Interstate 26 (I-26), and US 176 to its north.  The predominant features along the route is farmland mixed with forest and swamps.

History
Established as the second SC 27 around 1931, it traversed from SC 65 (current SC 61) in Givhans, to US 78 east of Ridgeville.  In 1940, it was rerouted north from Ridgeville to US 78 and then spur up to the Berkeley County line.  In 1941 or 1942, SC 27 was extended north into Berkeley County to SC 31 (current US 176).

The first SC 27 was an original state highway; established in 1922, it traversed from SC 21 in Trenton, south to Aiken, then east through Williston, Blackville, Denmark, Bamberg, and St. George before ending at SC 2.  In 1927, US 78 was assigned on all of SC 27 east of Aiken.  In 1928, all of SC 27 was decommissioned, SC 19 replaced the section between Aiken and Trenton.

Junction list

See also

References

External links

 
 Mapmikey's South Carolina Highways Page: SC 27

027
Transportation in Dorchester County, South Carolina
Transportation in Berkeley County, South Carolina